An election for the Alnwick District Council was held on 1 May 2003. The whole council was up for election and the council stayed under no overall control.  One of the three seats in the Rothbury and South Rural ward had no candidate for the seat.

Election result

5 Liberal Democrat, 2 Conservative and 1 Independent candidates were unopposed.

Ward results

External links
BBC report of 2003 Alnwick election result
Ward results and map (Archived 2009-10-25)

2003 English local elections
2003
21st century in Northumberland